Estádio Municipal dos Amaros is a stadium in Itápolis, Brazil. It has a capacity of 6,000 spectators. It was the home of Oeste Futebol Clube before they moved to Barueri.

References

Football venues in São Paulo (state)
Sports venues in São Paulo (state)